County Durham is a unitary authority area in the ceremonial county of Durham, North East England. It covers the former non-metropolitan county and its seven districts: Durham (city), Easington, Sedgefield (borough), Teesdale, Wear Valley, Derwentside, and Chester-le-Street. It is governed by Durham County Council and has 136 civil parishes.

The district is in a ceremonial county with three boroughs: Borough of Darlington, Borough of Hartlepool & Borough of Stockton-on-Tees (area north of the River Tees).

The area is 2,232.6 km2 (862 sq m).

History
The district was created on the 1 April 2009, following the merger of all the borough and districts (Excluding the boroughs of Darlington, Hartlepool and Stockton-on-Tees) which were already unitary authorities and the towns of Gateshead, Jarrow, South Shields and the city of Sunderland were already part of the Tyne and Wear metropolitan county from 1974.

Geography
The district has multiple hamlets and villages. Settlements with town status include Consett, Barnard Castle, Peterlee, Seaham, Bishop Auckland, Newton Aycliffe, Middleton-in-Teesdale, Shildon, Chester-le-Street, Crook, Stanley, Stanhope, Spennymoor, Ferryhill and Sedgefield while Durham is the only city in the district.

Governance
Following the 2021 United Kingdom local elections, the council is now under control of a coalition of the Liberal Democrats, Conservative Party, Independents and North East Party. 

The district is bounded to the south-west by North Yorkshire and south-east by the boroughs of Darlington, Stockton-on-Tees and Hartlepool. To the north-east of the district is the City of Sunderland and the Borough of Gateshead, to the north-west by Northumberland, Cumbria to the west.

References

External links
https://www.geopunk.co.uk/council/county-durham
https://www.alangodfreymaps.co.uk/durham1.htm

 
English unitary authorities created in 2009
Local government districts of North East England
NUTS 2 statistical regions of the United Kingdom
Unitary authority districts of England